Westfield-Barnes Regional Airport  is a joint civil-military airport in Hampden County, Massachusetts, three miles (6 km) north of Westfield and northwest of Springfield. It was formerly Barnes Municipal Airport; the National Plan of Integrated Airport Systems for 2011–2015 categorized it as a general aviation facility. Westfield-Barnes is one of Massachusetts' largest airports with a strong flight training, general aviation, and military presence. It is also known as Barnes Air National Guard Base.

History 
Camp Bartlett was a summer training facility of the Massachusetts Army National Guard in Westfield, Massachusetts from 1905 to around 1918. It later became a mobilization camp for the 26th Division for World War I. 

July 13, 1914 can be the date upon which aviation came to Westfield. Jack McGee of Pawtucket, Rhode Island flew a Wright biplane over Westfield and the flight originated on a strip of land near Southampton Road and the Holyoke Rail Bridge. McGee was hired by local merchants to drop tickets from his airplane which could have been claimed for prizes.

After the United States entered World War I the expansive plain was heavily used by the federal government in August–September 1917 as Camp Bartlett, a mobilization and training camp for the 103rd and 104th Infantry Regiments of the 26th "Yankee" Division, prior to deployment in France.

In 1923 citizens of Westfield, and nearby Holyoke set out to build an airport. A group of influential local businessmen was charged to convince the owner of the land where the airport is now, Vincent E. Barnes, to sell his land to the City of Westfield for an airport. Barnes agreed to donate his land. The  plot was named Westfield Aviation Field and was dedicated on October 12, 1923. As the field gained in popularity, Vincent Barnes leased the city another  plot, with a fee of $1 per year starting in 1927. In 1936 Mrs. Barnes and her daughter Saddie Knox donated an additional 297 acres (1.2 km2) to the city of Westfield; shortly thereafter, the City Council voted to name the airport after the family that made it possible.

In 1939-40 the administration building, hangar, and the beacon light were built with grant money totaling near $90,000. Soon a passenger service started: on October 28, 1937, a 10-passenger tri-motor Stinson began weekly flights between Westfield and Newark, New Jersey. American Airlines DC-3s operated out of Westfield 1938 to 1950 and Mohawk DC-3s 1953 to 1959. The January 1951 chart shows 4970-ft runway 2, 3970-ft runway 9, and 5000-ft runway 15; same nine years later except runway 2 was 7000 ft.

In the last 50 years the airport has expanded to 1,200 acres and added a VORTAC and an ILS. In 1974 the Air Traffic Control Tower opened.

A $7.6 million construction project started in April 2020 to rebuild runway 15–33.  The last reconstruction of this runway was completed in 1970's.

As of 2020 the Massachusetts Air National Guard base is the home of the 104th Fighter Wing.

Facilities
The airport covers 1,200 acres (5 km2) at an elevation of 270 feet (82 m). It has two asphalt runways: 2/20 is 9,000 by 150 feet (2,743 × 46 m) and 15/33 is 5,000 by 100 feet (1,524 × 30 m).

The airport recently opened a new administration and terminal, replacing a terminal that housed the original control tower. It is also the site of a major Massachusetts Air National Guard fighter jet wing and support installation.

Aircraft 
In the year ending May 31, 2010 the airport had 57,031 aircraft operations, average 156 per day: 89% general aviation, 10% military, and 1% air taxi.

155 aircraft were then based at the airport: 72.9% single-engine, 3.9% multi-engine, 11.6% jet, and 11.6% military.

Occasionally the airport will service charter flights for the University of Massachusetts Amherst sports teams such as by Sun Country Airlines using Boeing 737-800 aircraft.

Fixed-base operator and Maintenance Facilities 
Barnes Regional Airport has one fixed-base operator (FBOs) and one G A Maintenance Facility.

Rectrix Aviation is the newest FBO, operating in the new terminal building which includes a conference room, weather facilities, and  comprehensive pilot services.  They sell Shell fuel and provide typical FBO services. In late 2015, Rectrix bought out Five Star Jet Center, a former competitor and previously longest standing FBO on the field. Rectrix is now the sole FBO at Barnes.

Aero Design Concepts / Aero Design Aircraft Services is a maintenance facility offering maintenance and repair services, including interiors and upholstery to all G A aircraft. Established in 1984, Aero Design is the sole G A maintenance facility on the airport. Aero Design also offers daily and extended tie downs on its ramp. 
Aero Design is located at the intersections of taxiways Alfa and Bravo, right below the Tower.

Flight schools
Barnes Regional Airport has three FAA-approved flight schools.

The largest program is an official part 141 flight school named Westfield Flight Academy.  The flight school offers instruction in four Cessna 172s, a Cessna 172 Cutlass RG, two Piper Cherokees, and a Piper Seneca.  It is run by a current JetBlue Airways pilot and a Springfield attorney.

In addition, AD-UP Aviation operates a part 61 flight school out of the new terminal building.  The school is run by a Master Certified Flight instructor, one of fewer than a dozen in Massachusetts.  Instruction is given in high-wing, tail-dragger, and spin training.

Restaurant and bar
The former Flight Deck restaurant was replaced with The Runway Restaurant and Lounge when the new terminal opened.  The Runway was operated by the owner of the now-closed B'Sharas Restaurant of West Springfield.  It featured a full menu and bar.  The Runway, like most of the terminal, was open to the public.

The Runway restaurant closed in early 2015 and became occupied by Papps Bar.  Papp’s closed after approximately 2 years in operation and became Sok’s which offered high end cocktails and Asian Fusion type fair. Sok’s closed after another 18-24 months.  Since early 2020, the restaurant portion has been taken over by a pair of partners, one being the head chef, and is called Tobiko, which translates to “Flying Fish”. They offer an extensive sushi and sashimi menu, as well as true ramen, and many other house made Asian fare. They have also utilities deck and open bar space for a first hand view of the tarmac and the surrounding scenery, the boisterous dual Pratt and Whitney afterburners of the F-15 are almost part of the allure if the 104th scrambles or is involved in training.

References

External links
 Westfield-Barnes Airport (official site)
 104th Fighter Wing, Massachusetts Air National Guard
 Five Star Jet Center (FBO/Flight School)
 AirFlyte, Inc. (FBO)
 AD-UP Aviation (Flight School/Aerial Advertising)
 The Runway by B'Sharas (Restaurant and Bar)
 Aerial image as of April 2001 from USGS The National Map
 
 

Westfield, Massachusetts
Airports established in 1923
1923 establishments in Massachusetts
Airports in Hampden County, Massachusetts
Closed installations of the United States Navy